Jeff Britting (born 1957) is an American composer, playwright, author, and producer.

His credits include associate-producing the 1997 Academy Award Nominee for Best Documentary Ayn Rand: A Sense of Life with director Michael Paxton, for which he also wrote the musical score. He is curator of the Ayn Rand Archives at the Ayn Rand Institute. In 2004, he published an illustrated biography of Ayn Rand's life titled Ayn Rand.

External links
 New York Times info on Ayn Rand: A Sense of Life
 Ayn Rand: A Sense of Life Soundtrack
 
 Aloud Article on Jeff Britting
 NY Sun article, discusses Britting's Rand bio
 Review of Ayn Rand by Jeff Britting

Objectivists
American film score composers
American male film score composers
1957 births
American documentary filmmakers
Living people